Jose Ramón Trevino (born November 28, 1992) is an American professional baseball catcher for the New York Yankees of Major League Baseball (MLB). The Texas Rangers selected Trevino in the sixth round of the 2014 MLB draft. He made his MLB debut in 2018 with the Rangers, who traded him to the Yankees before the 2022 season. He is the first American League catcher and the first member of the New York Yankees to ever win a Platinum Glove Award.

Amateur career
Trevino attended St. John Paul II High School in Corpus Christi, Texas. Undrafted out of high school, he attended Oral Roberts University and played college baseball for the Golden Eagles.In 2012, he played collegiate summer baseball in the Northwoods League for the Madison Mallards playing in 22 games and hitting four home runs and five doubles. Trevino struck out only 12 times in 83 at-bats and totaled 17 hits. In 2013, he played collegiate summer baseball in the Cape Cod Baseball League for the Yarmouth-Dennis Red Sox.

Professional career

Texas Rangers
The Texas Rangers selected Trevino in the sixth round of the 2014 MLB draft. He made his professional debut with the Spokane Indians of the Class A Short Season Northwest League, playing catcher, third base, and second base, while hitting .257/.313/.448/.761 with 9 home runs and 49 RBIs. Trevino played for the Hickory Crawdads of the Class A South Atlantic League in 2015, hitting .262/.291/.415/.707 with 14 home runs along with 63 RBIs, while becoming a full-time catcher. After the season, he played in the Arizona Fall League. In 2016, he played for the High Desert Mavericks of the Class A-Advanced California League and won a minor league Gold Glove Award. With High Desert, he hit .303/.342/.434/.776 with nine home runs and 68 RBIs. He played in the Arizona Fall League after the season for the second consecutive year.

Trevino spent 2017 with the Frisco RoughRiders of the Double-A Texas League, hitting .241/.275/.323/.598 with 7 home runs and 42 RBIs. The Rangers added Trevino to their 40-man roster after the 2017 season. Trevino was awarded the MiLB Rawlings Gold Glove Award for catchers, in both 2016 and 2017. He spent the 2018 minor league season with Frisco, hitting .234/.284/.332/.615 with three home runs and 16 RBIs.

Trevino made his major league debut with the Rangers on June 15, 2018, in a game against the Colorado Rockies. On June 16, Trevino recorded his first major league hit, a RBI single. On June 17, Trevino delivered his first career walk-off hit, a 2-run single off of Wade Davis. Trevino underwent season-ending surgery on his left shoulder on July 20, 2018.

In 2019, Trevino split minor league time between the Triple-A Nashville Sounds and the AZL Rangers of the Rookie-level Arizona League, hitting a combined .214/.253/.324/.577 with 3 home runs and 28 RBIs. Trevino suffered a quad injury and was placed on the injured list from May 19 to June 24. He was recalled to Texas on August 2. He finished the 2019 season with Texas hitting .258/.272/.383/.655 with 2 home runs and 13 RBIs over 40 games.
 
Trevino played in 24 games for the Rangers in the pandemic shortened season in 2020, slashing .250/.280/.434 with two home runs and nine RBIs in 76 at-bats. Over 89 games in 2021, Trevino hit .239/.267/.340/.607 with five home runs and 30 RBIs.

New York Yankees

On April 2, 2022, the Rangers traded Trevino to the New York Yankees in exchange for Albert Abreu and Robert Ahlstrom.

Trevino was named an American League All-Star Reserve at catcher in 2022 after accumulating the second most catcher WAR in the AL.

In 2022 he batted .248/.283/.388 with 11 home runs and 43 RBIs. He was one of the best defensive players of the season, winning a Fielding Bible Award, a Gold Glove Award, and being the first New York Yankee and the first American League catcher to win the Platinum Glove Award as the best defensive player in his league.

Personal life
Trevino's father, Joe "Bugé" Trevino, died during Jose's junior year at Oral Roberts. Trevino has one son who was born five days before he made his MLB debut.

References

External links

Oral Roberts Golden Eagles bio

1992 births
Living people
American baseball players of Mexican descent
American League All-Stars
Gold Glove Award winners
Sportspeople from Corpus Christi, Texas
Baseball players from Texas
Major League Baseball catchers
Texas Rangers players
New York Yankees players
Oral Roberts Golden Eagles baseball players
Yarmouth–Dennis Red Sox players
Arizona League Rangers players
Spokane Indians players
Hickory Crawdads players
Surprise Saguaros players
High Desert Mavericks players
Frisco RoughRiders players
Nashville Sounds players
Madison Mallards players